Carlos Kenji Yoshimura   (born February 22, 1984) is a Brazilian baseball pitcher. He attended Hakuoh University and has played for the Yamaha team in the Japanese Industrial League. He represented Brazil at the 2003 Pan American Games, 2003 Baseball World Cup and 2013 World Baseball Classic.

References

External links
Baseball America

1984 births
2013 World Baseball Classic players
Brazilian expatriate baseball players in Japan
Brazilian people of Japanese descent
Living people
Sportspeople from São Paulo (state)
Baseball players at the 2003 Pan American Games
Pan American Games competitors for Brazil